"La Dolce Musto" is a weekly humorous celebrity gossip column, syndicated by The Village Voice and written by Michael Musto.

External links
 "La Dolce Musto" page at The Village Voice.

The Village Voice